Frosty, Frostee, Frostie, or Frosties may refer to:

People
 Wayne "Frosty Freeze" Frost (1963–2008), a Puerto Rican old-school hip hop b-boy and breakdancer
 Glen "Frosty" Little (1925–2010), a circus clown with the Ringling Bros. and Barnum & Bailey Circus
 Frosty Peters (1904–1980), American National Football League player
 Frostee Rucker, (born 1983), American National Football League player
 Frosty, a guitarist in the American hardcore band Chain of Strength
 Mark Winterbottom (born 1981), nicknamed "Frosty", Australian professional racing driver
 Ross Ulbricht

Fictional characters
Frosty the Snowman, the protagonist of:
 "Frosty the Snowman", a Christmas song written by Walter "Jack" Rollins and Steve Nelson, and first recorded by Gene Autry and the Cass County Boys in 1950
 Frosty the Snowman (TV program), a 1969 animated television special based on the song, followed by three sequels:
 Frosty's Winter Wonderland (1976), an animated television special
 Frosty Returns (1992), an animated television special
 The Legend of Frosty the Snowman (2005), a made-for-video animated film
 Frosty Returns (1992)
 Frostee, a recurring character in the Filipino comic strip Pugad Baboy

Food and drink
 Frosted Flakes, a sugared breakfast cereal produced by American multinational food processing corporation Kellogg's, known as Frosties in Europe
 Frostie Root Beer, a soft drink marketed by Intrastate Distributors Inc.
 Frosties, a hard-boiled cola or fruit-flavored frosted candy sold in the United Kingdom by the Barratt brand
 Frosty (frozen dairy dessert), a frozen dairy dessert offered by fast food chain Wendy's
 Frosty Boy, an advertising character in Australia and New Zealand
 The Frosties Kid, an advertisement for Frosted Flakes cereal that aired in 2006 in the United Kingdom, the teenaged actor who portrayed the character, or the Internet meme featuring the character

Other uses 
 Cape Cod Frosty, an American one-design class of sailboats
 Frosty (Aerosol burn), freezing of the skin due to misuse of an aerosol spray
 Ulmus parvifolia 'Frosty', an ornamental variety of the tree Ulmus parvifolia

See also
 
 
 Frosti (disambiguation)
 Frost (disambiguation)